Owregan (also Romanized as Owregān and Ūrgān; also known as Owregūn) is a village in Chenarud-e Jonubi Rural District, Chenarud District, Chadegan County, Isfahan Province, Iran. At the 2006 census, its population was 848, in 199 families.

References 

Populated places in Chadegan County